Ernest Mint Jones (born December 10, 1910) is an American former Negro league first baseman who played between 1937 and 1941. 

A native of Tampa, Florida, Jones made his Negro leagues debut in 1937 with the Jacksonville Red Caps. He remained with the club through 1941, as it moved to Cleveland in 1939, and then back to Jacksonville in 1941.

References

External links
 and Baseball-Reference Black Baseball stats and Seamheads

1910 births
Year of death missing
Cleveland Bears players
Jacksonville Red Caps players
Baseball infielders